"Walk of Life" is a 1985 single by Dire Straits.

Walk of Life may also refer to:

 Walk of Life (album), a 2000 album by Billie Piper
 "Walk of Life" (Billie Piper song), 2000
 "Walk of Life", a 1998 song by Spice Girls from the Sabrina, the Teenage Witch soundtrack 
 Walk of Life, an annual walk at the Tamworth Country Music Festival

See also
 Walks of Life, a 2007 album by Gina Jeffreys
 Walk of My Life, a 2015 album by Kumi Koda